Pueblo Nuevo Municipality may refer to:
 Pueblo Nuevo Municipality, Córdoba, Colombia
 Pueblo Nuevo Municipality, Durango, Mexico
 Pueblo Nuevo Municipality, Guanajuato, Mexico

Municipality name disambiguation pages